Surat Thani, often shortened to Surat, is the largest of the southern provinces (changwat) of Thailand. It lies on the western shore of the Gulf of Thailand. Surat Thani means 'city of good people', a title given to the city by King Vajiravudh (Rama VI); Surat Thani is therefore the sole province in Southern Thailand for which the native name is in the Central Thai language.

Geography
Neighbouring provinces are (from north, clockwise) Chumphon, Nakhon Si Thammarat, Krabi, Phang Nga, and Ranong.

Geographically, the centre of the province is the coastal plain of the Tapi River, mostly grassland interspersed with rubber trees and coconut plantations. In the west are the limestone mountains of the Phuket range which are  mostly covered with forest. Khao Sok National Park is found there. To the east the hills of the Nakhon Si Thammarat (or Bantat) mountain range start to rise, protected in the Tai Rom Yen National Park.

Many islands in the Gulf of Thailand belong to the district, including the tourist islands Ko Samui, Ko Pha Ngan and Ko Tao, as well as the Ko Ang Thong Marine National Park.

The main rivers of Surat Thani province are the Tapi River and the Phum Duang River, which join at the town Tha Kham shortly before they flow into Bandon Bay. The delta of these rivers, locally known as Nai Bang (ในบาง), is directly north of the city of Surat Thani. It consists of several channels with small islands mostly covered by mangroves and orchards.

National parks
There are a total of eight national parks, six ofwhich are in region 4 (Surat Thani) and Hat Khanom–Mu Ko Thale Tai and Namtok Si Khit are in region 5 (Nakhon Si Thammarat) of Thailand's protected areas. 
 Khao Sok National Park, 
 Kaeng Krung National Park, 
 Tai Rom Yen National Park, 
 Khlong Phanom National Park, 
 Hat Khanom–Mu Ko Thale Tai National Park, 
 Namtok Si Khit National Park, 
 Mu Ko Ang Thong National Park, 
 Than Sadet–Ko Pha-ngan National Park,

Wildlife sanctuaries
There are two wildlife sanctuaries, along with five other wildlife sanctuaries, make up region 4 (Surat Thani) of Thailand's protected areas. 
 Khlong Saeng Wildlife Sanctuary, 
 Khlong Yan Wildlife Sanctuary,

History
The area of Surat Thani was already inhabited in prehistoric times by Semang and Malayan tribes. Founded in the 3rd century, the Srivijaya kingdom dominated the Malay Peninsula until the 13th century. The city of Chaiya contains ruins from the Srivijaya period, and it was probably a regional capital of the kingdom. Some Thai historians even argue that it was the kingdom's capital for a time, but this is disputed. Wiang Sa was another important settlement of the time.

After the fall of the Srivijaya, the area was divided into the cities (mueang) of Chaiya, Thatong (now Kanchanadit), and Khirirat Nikhom. Chaiya was administered directly from the Thai capital, while Thatong and Khirirat were controlled by the Nakhon Si Thammarat Kingdom. In 1899, they were all merged into a single province called Chaiya. In 1915, the court of the Monthon Chumphon was transferred  to Bandon, which received the new name of Surat Thani on 29 July 1915, during a visit of King Vajiravudh (Rama VI). This was likely influenced by the major port city of Surat in Gujarat, India. The monthon was also renamed Surat. In 1926 it was abolished and incorporated into monthon Nakhon Si Thammarat. The monthon was dissolved in 1933, and the province became a first level administrative subdivision.

The provincial administration was in a building in Tha Kham (Phunphin District). Shortly before World War II, it was moved to the city of Surat Thani, on the banks of the Tapi River, which is named after the Tapi River in Surat, located southern of Gujarat, India. When the Japanese invaded Thailand on 8 December 1941, the administrative building was destroyed during the battle for the city. It was rebuilt in 1954, but on 19 March 1982, a bomb planted by communist rebels blew up the building, killing five people. The third and present building was relocated to the south of the city, and the former site of the provincial hall is now the site of the city pillar shrine (Lak Mueang).

Symbols
The seal of the province shows the pagoda of Wat Phra Borommathat Chaiya, which is believed to have been built 1,200 years ago. The flag of the province shows the pagoda in middle, placed on a horizontally split flag with orange on top and yellow on the bottom.

The provincial flower is the bua phut (Rafflesia kerrii), a parasitic plant with one of the biggest flowers of all plants. The provincial tree is the ton kiam (Cotylelobium melanoxylon).

The provincial slogan is "เมืองร้อยเกาะ เงาะอร่อย หอยใหญ่ ไข่แดง แหล่งธรรมะ" (Mueang roi ko, ngo aroi, hoi yai, khai daeng, laeng thamma), which translates to "city of 100 islands, delicious rambutan, big shells, red eggs, the center of Buddhism". "Red eggs" refers to a local culinary specialty of salted duck egg, while the "big shells" refers to abundant oyster available. "Center of Buddhism" refers to the Wat Phra Borommathat Chaiya and Suan Mokkhaphalaram.

Administrative divisions

Provincial government
The province is divided into 19 districts (amphoes), which are further divided into 131 subdistricts (tambons) and 1,028 villages (mubans).

Local government
As of 26 November 2019 there are: one Surat Thani Provincial Administration Organisation and 40 municipal (thesaban) areas in the province. Surat Thani and Ko Samui have city (thesaban nakhon) status. Tha Kham, Na San and Don Sak have town (thesaban mueang) status. Further 35 subdistrict municipalities (thesaban tambon). The non-municipal areas are administered by 97 Subdistrict Administrative Organisations - SAO (ongkan borihan suan tambon).

For national elections, the province is divided into two constituencies, each eligible to elect three members of parliament.

Economy
In the 2008 census, the province had a GPP of 132,637.3 million baht (US$4,019.31 million) and GPP per capita of 134,427 (US$4,073.54) compared with a GPP of 122,398 million baht (US$3,599.94 million) and GPP per capita of 125,651 baht (US$3,695.62) in the 2007 census, with a GPP growth rate of 8.37 percent and per capita growth rate of 6.98 percent.

The main agricultural products of the province are coconut and rambutan. The coconuts are often picked from the tree by specially trained monkeys, mostly pig-tailed macaques (Macaca nemestrina). The monkey school of the late Somporn Saekhow is the most known training centre. Rambutan trees were first planted in Surat Thani in 1926 by the Chinese Malay Mr. K. Vong in Ban Na San District. An annual rambutan fair is held in early-August and includes a parade of highly decorated floats on the Tapi River. Rubber tree plantations are also common in the province.

A notable local product is the hand-woven silk cloth from the coastal village Phum Riang in Chaiya District. Chaiya is also the most famous source of red eggs, a local specialty. Ducks are fed with crabs and fish and the eggs are then preserved by placing them in a soil-salt mixture.

Tourism is the major source of provincial income. The province earned 64 billion baht from tourism in 2018. That revenue accounted for 63 percent of Surat Thani's overall tourism income, most of it attributable to its island attractions: Ko Samui, Ko Pha Ngan, Ko Tao, and Mu Ko Ang Thong National Park.

Human achievement index 2017

Since 2003, United Nations Development Programme (UNDP) in Thailand has tracked progress on human development at sub-national level using the Human achievement index (HAI), a composite index covering all the eight key areas of human development. National Economic and Social Development Board (NESDB) has taken over this task since 2017.

National parks
 Mu Ko Ang Thong National Park is a marine national park in the Gulf of Thailand. It covers 42 islands and a total area of 102 km2, of which about 50 km2 are land and the rest is water. The park was established on 12 November 1980. The northern tip of Ko Phaluai is also part of the marine park. There is a ranger station, bungalows, a shop, and a restaurant at Ao Phi Beach on Ko Wua Talap.
 Khao Sok National Park is the largest area of virgin forest in southern Thailand and is a remnant of rain forest which is older and more diverse than the Amazon rain forest.

Gallery

References

External links

Province page from the Tourist Authority of Thailand

Official website 

Surat Thani provincial map, coat of arms and postal stamp

 
Provinces of Thailand
Southern Thailand
Gulf of Thailand